The Royal Convent of Santa Clara is a nunnery in Tordesillas, Spain. Founded by king Pedro of Castile in 1363, this convent of Poor Clares is now under the administration of Spain's national heritage organisation, the Patrimonio Nacional.

It is noted for its mudéjar architecture, such as the ceiling of the church. The ceiling employs a type of decoration called artesonado.

Fernando de Illescas reformed the convent in the late 14th century.

See also

 Girih
 Islamic geometric patterns

References

External links 
 Royal Convent of Santa Clara
 Royal Monastery of Santa Clara - Museum Guide

Santa Clara
Santa Clara
1363 establishments in Europe
Bien de Interés Cultural landmarks in the Province of Valladolid
Convents in Spain
Mudéjar architecture in Castile and León
14th-century establishments in Castile